Eupithecia tarapaca is a moth in the family Geometridae first described by Rindge in 1989. It is found in the region of Taracap'a in Arica Province, Chile. The habitat consists of either the Northern
Desert or the Northern Andean Cordillera Biotic Provinces.

The length of the forewings is about 9 mm for males. The forewings are grey, with numerous dark grey, greyish-brown, and greyish-black scales, appearing dark grey. The hindwings are pale greyish white, pale grey distally and greyish black along the anal margin. Adults have been recorded on wing in November.

Etymology
The specific name is based on the type locality.

References

Moths described in 1989
tarapaca
Moths of South America
Endemic fauna of Chile